Yacine El Kassah (born 8 January 2000) is a French footballer who plays as a midfielder for CAB.

Career

In 2016, El Kassah joined the youth academy of Italian Serie A side Inter. In 2019, he signed for CAB in Tunisia. On 8 February 2020, he debuted for CAB during a 1–2 loss to CSHL.

References

External links
 

French footballers
Expatriate footballers in Italy
French sportspeople of Tunisian descent
Expatriate footballers in Tunisia
CA Bizertin players
Living people
Association football midfielders
2000 births
French expatriate sportspeople in Tunisia
Footballers from Paris
Tunisian Ligue Professionnelle 1 players
French expatriate sportspeople in Italy
French expatriate footballers